Burnside railway station serves the Burnside and Blairbeth areas of the Royal Burgh of Rutherglen, South Lanarkshire, Greater Glasgow, Scotland. The station is managed by ScotRail and is located on the Newton branch of the Cathcart Circle Lines, which has been electrified since 1962 by British Railways. This is the busiest railway station on the Newton branch.

History 
The station was opened by the Lanarkshire and Ayrshire Railway on 1 August 1904. Later taken over by the Caledonian Railway, it became part of the London, Midland and Scottish Railway at the 1923 Grouping and subsequently the Scottish Region of British Railways at nationalisation in 1948.  B.R electrified the line through the station in 1962, when the section beyond  was closed - since that time, all services have run to/from Glasgow only, though it became possible to travel there via both sides of the Circle following track alterations in the Carthcart area carried out as part of the modernisation work.

Facilities 
Access to this station is by one of two railway bridges and as a result there is no disabled access to trains from here. A single waiting room serves both platforms. The ticket office is only open on Mondays to Saturdays. Customer information screens are also available at this station. A help point is available, like on every other ScotRail station in Glasgow. Automatic announcements have recently been fitted at this station as well as all the stations on the Cathcart Circle.  There is no dedicated car park, but six cycle storage places are available.

Services

From 1974 
Following the electrification of the West Coast Main Line by British Rail, the basic service was:
 Monday to Saturday
 Sundays
 Additional peak hour services were provided to  via both sides of the Hamilton Circle.

From 1979 
Following the opening of the Argyle Line in November 1979 by British Rail, services on the Cathcart Circle were reorganised. The basic service was:
 Monday to Saturday
 Sundays

From 2005 
 Monday to Sunday

References

Notes

Sources 

 
 
 

Railway stations in South Lanarkshire
Former Caledonian Railway stations
Railway stations in Great Britain opened in 1904
SPT railway stations
Buildings and structures in Rutherglen
Railway stations served by ScotRail
1904 establishments in Scotland